Thomas Wingfield Grimes (December 18, 1844 – October 28, 1905) was an American politician and lawyer.

Biography
Grimes was born in Columbus, Georgia. After earning his Bachelor of Arts degree from the University of Georgia in Athens in 1863, Grimes studied law and became a practicing lawyer.

After serving in the Confederate Army during the Civil War, Grimes was elected to the Georgia House of Representatives in 1868, 1869, 1875, and 1876, the Georgia Senate in 1878 and 1879, and the U.S. House of Representatives in 1886 and 1888.

Grimes died in Columbus in 1905 and was buried in Linwood Cemetery.

References

1844 births
1905 deaths
Democratic Party Georgia (U.S. state) state senators
Democratic Party members of the Georgia House of Representatives
Georgia (U.S. state) lawyers
Confederate States Army soldiers
University of Georgia alumni
Democratic Party members of the United States House of Representatives from Georgia (U.S. state)
19th-century American politicians